Fremantle Woolstores were at least four large buildings on the southern side of Fremantle Harbour,  in Fremantle, Western Australia.

They include:
 Westralian Farmers
 Elder Smith and Co
 Goldsborough Mort
 Dalgety and Co

The larger two operations were Elders Woolstore and Dalgety Woolstore.

In time the various competitors combined activities such as the Wool Exchange in Norfolk Street, where Wesfarmers and Edler Smith Goldsborough Mort combined between 1984 and 1997.

In the 1940s the Dalgety woolstore was used to store for sale, locally grown tobacco.

The large woolstore buildings remained notable in the Fremantle landscape long after their wool storage facility was closed down.

The Dalgety woolstore building has a Queen Victoria Street frontage. Elders woolstore nearby on Elder Place has become a heritage listed building.

Notes

Buildings and structures in Fremantle